Fremont Glacier may refer to:

Fremont Glacier (Washington) in North Cascades National Park, Washington, USA
Lower Fremont Glacier in the Wind River Range, Wyoming, USA
Upper Fremont Glacier in the Wind River Range, Wyoming, USA